Kabira may refer to:
 Kabir (1440–1518), an Indian poet and saint
 Kabira Bay, a bay in the northwestern part of Ishigaki Island, Ryukyu, Japan
 Kabira, Okinawa, a village near Kabira Bay in the northwestern part of Ishigaki Island, Ryukyu, Japan
"Kabira" (song), a song from the 2013 Bollywood movie Yeh Jawaani Hai Deewani